Aceras may refer to:

Animals 
 Xenophrys aceras, a species of amphibian

Orchids
 Aceras, a genus of orchid
 Gongora aceras, a species of orchid
 Aceras anthropophorum, a species of orchid
 Aceras caprinum, a species of orchid
 Aceras fragrans, a species of orchid